James R. Brewster is an American politician who has served as a member of the Pennsylvania Senate for the 45th District since 2010.

Education 
Brewster earned a Bachelor of Arts degree in education from the California University of Pennsylvania.

Career 
Brewster is a former vice president for fraud management with Mellon Bank and mayor of McKeesport, Pennsylvania.

On November 2, 2010, Brewster won a special election to fill the remaining term of Senator Sean F. Logan, who had resigned his seat on August 24, 2010, to take a position at the University of Pittsburgh Medical Center. Brewster was sworn into the Pennsylvania Senate on November 17, 2010.

In July 2020, Brewster organized a meeting with bar and restaurant owners and signed a letter to Governor Tom Wolf urging him to lessen the restrictions on them imposed during the COVID-19 pandemic.

2020 election 

In January 2021, although Brewster narrowly defeated his opponent, Republican Nicole Ziccarelli, by 69 votes, the Republican-led State Senate refused to swear in Brewster for his fourth term, despite the fact that his win had already been certified by state officials. Lieutenant Governor John Fetterman attempted to swear Brewster in. In a bizarre move, Republican leaders voted to remove Fetterman from his presiding role and halt Brewster's seating. Senator Jake Corman, when reading out names of the new and re-elected senators, intentionally omitted Brewster's, with Republicans once again voting to confirm the disruptive action.

After a federal court ruling re-affirmed his win over Ziccarelli, Brewster was sworn in on January 13, 2021.

References

External links
Pennsylvania Senate - Jim Brewster 
Pennsylvania Senate Democratic Caucus - Jim Brewster

Living people
Democratic Party Pennsylvania state senators
Politicians from Pittsburgh
21st-century American politicians
Year of birth missing (living people)